Vladimir Oreshin (born 21 February 1951) is an association football midfielder who played for Soviet club Alga Frunze throughout the 1960s, 1970s and 1980s.

Career
Born in Osh, Oreshin moved to Frunze to play football with Soviet First League side FC Alga Frunze at age 15. Oreshin played professionally for Alga, spending seven seasons in the Soviet First League with the club before announcing his retirement in 1987. Oreshin also played for the Soviet Union's national youth team.

Following the dissolution of the Soviet Union, Oreshin played for local clubs in the Kyrgyzstan League until he retired a final time at age 47. As of September 1997, he had scored more goals in the Soviet and Kyrgyzstan leagues than any other footballer from Kyrgyzstan.

References

External links
Profile at Footballfacts.ru

1951 births
Living people
Soviet footballers
Kyrgyzstani footballers
Association football midfielders
FC Alga Bishkek players
FC Alay players